Muhammad Ilham Amirullah Bin Razali (born 26 February 1994) is a Malaysian footballer who currently plays as a goalkeeper for Malaysian club Kedah Darul Aman in Malaysia Super League.

Career statistics

Club

References

External links
 

1994 births
Living people
Malaysian people of Malay descent
Malaysian footballers
Malaysia international footballers
Malaysia Super League players
Association football goalkeepers
Terengganu FC players
Negeri Sembilan FA players
Terengganu F.C. II players